Platydoris is a genus of sea slugs, dorid nudibranchs, shell-less marine gastropod mollusks in the family Discodorididae. These nudibranchs are large and often brightly coloured, but normally live concealed beneath rocks or loose coral, feeding on sponges. During the night they become more active, searching for new food sources or mates. Many species were described in the 19th century and a revision in 2002 added six new species.

Species
Species in the genus Platydoris include:

 Platydoris angustipes (Mörch, 1863)
 Platydoris annulata Dorgan, Valdes & Gosliner, 2002 
 Platydoris argo (Linnaeus, 1767) - type species of the genus Platydoris
 Platydoris carinata Risbec, 1928
 Platydoris carolynae Mulliner & Sphon, 1974
 Platydoris cinereobranchiata Dorgan, Valdes & Gosliner, 2002
 Platydoris cruenta (Quoy & Gaimard, 1832)  
 Platydoris dierythros Fahey & Valdés, 2003 
 Platydoris ellioti (Alder & Hancock, 1864)
 Platydoris esakii (Baba, 1936)
 Platydoris formosa (Alder & Hancock, 1864)
 Platydoris galbana Burn, 1958
 Platydoris guarani Lima & Simone, 2018
 Platydoris inframaculata (Abraham, 1877)
 Platydoris inornata Dorgan, Valdes & Gosliner, 2002
 Platydoris macfarlandi Hanna, 1951
 Platydoris ocellata Dorgan, Valdés & Gosliner, 2002
 Platydoris pulchra Eliot, 1904
 Platydoris rolani Dorgan, Valdés & Gosliner, 2002 
 Platydoris sabulosa Dorgan, Valdés & Gosliner, 2002
 Platydoris sanguinea Bergh, 1905
 Platydoris scabra (Cuvier, 1804)
 Platydoris spongilla Risbec, 1928
 Platydoris striata (Kelaart, 1858)
 Platydoris tabulata Abraham, 1877 - nomen dubium

Species brought into synonymy
 Platydoris arrogans Bergh, 1877: synonym of Platydoris cruenta (Quoy & Gaimard, 1832)
 Platydoris dura Pruvot-Fol, 1951: synonym of Platydoris argo (Linnaeus, 1767)
 Platydoris eurychlamys Bergh, 1877: synonym of Platydoris scabra (Cuvier, 1804)
 Platydoris flammulata Bergh, 1905: synonym of Platydoris angustipes (Mörch, 1863)
 Platydoris immonda Risbec, 1928: synonym of Doris immonda Risbec, 1928
 Platydoris incerta Eliot, 1904: synonym of Platydoris pulchra Eliot, 1904
 Platydoris laminea Risbec, 1928: synonym of Discodoris laminea (Risbec, 1928)
 Platydoris maculata Bouchet, 1977 : synonym of Baptodoris cinnabarina Bergh, 1884
 Platydoris noumeae Risbec, 1928: synonym of Platydoris scabra (Cuvier, 1804)
 Platydoris papillata Eliot, 1903: synonym of Asteronotus raripilosus (Abraham, 1877)
 Platydoris peruviana (d'Orbigny, 1837)  synonym of Baptodoris peruviana (d'Orbigny, 1837)
 Platydoris philippi Bergh, 1877: synonym of Platydoris argo (Linnaeus, 1767)
 Platydoris punctatella Bergh, 1898: synonym of Baptodoris peruviana (d'Orbigny, 1837)
 Platydoris rubra White, 1952: synonym of Platydoris angustipes (Mörch, 1863)
 Platydoris stomascuta Bouchet, 1977: synonym of Baptodoris stomascuta (Bouchet, 1977)

References

Discodorididae
Gastropod genera